A rescission bill is a type of bill in the United States that rescinds funding that was previously included in an appropriations bill.  Rescission bills proposed by the President of the United States are considered under an expedited process that cannot be filibustered in the Senate, allowing it to pass with 51 votes instead of 60.  The procedure was introduced in 1974 as a replacement for impoundment.  It was widely used between its introduction and 2000, but then fell into disuse until 2018.

Procedure 
The process begins with the president submitting a rescission proposal to the House Committee on Appropriations and Senate Committee on Appropriations. Each committee has 25 days to approve or disapprove the proposal; if a committee takes no action the bill becomes subject to a discharge petition. Each House considers the bill under an expedited procedure that does not allow a filibuster in the Senate. The bill must be passed within 45 days after the original proposal to be enacted, and the budget authority is delayed during these 45 days.

In practice, rescission proposals have usually been incorporated into larger appropriations bills considered through the normal process rather than passed as standalone bills using the expedited process.  In addition to the presidential rescission procedure, Congress may initiate rescissions as part of a normal appropriations bill.

History 
The rescission process was instituted by the Congressional Budget and Impoundment Control Act of 1974.   It was replacement for the broad impoundment authority that was removed by the bill.  The Balanced Budget and Emergency Deficit Control Reaffirmation Act of 1987 prohibited repeatedly submitting identical or similar rescission proposals to extend the 45-day window for delaying the budget authority.

Between 1974 and 2000, presidents submitted 1178 rescission proposals totaling $76 billion, of which Congress accepted 461 totaling $25 billion.  The last presidential rescission proposal was made for fiscal year 2000 during the Clinton administration.  No presidential rescission proposals were requested during the presidencies of George W. Bush or of Barack Obama, although George W. Bush proposed "cancellations" of funding in the 2007 federal budget through a message that did not use the formal presidential rescission procedure.

In April 2018, President Donald Trump announced his intention to develop a rescission proposal in response to the large funding increases contained in the Consolidated Appropriations Act, 2018, which had passed the previous month.  The proposal was scaled back, however, after pushback by Congressional leadership to include $15 billion in rescissions mainly targeting funds that were already unspent.  In June 2018, the bill, the Spending Cuts to Expired and Unnecessary Programs Act, passed the House 210–206 but failed in the Senate 48–50.

References